Pellonula is a small genus of fish in the herring family, Clupeidae.  There are currently two recognized species in this genus.  Both species of this genus are native to Africa.

Species
 Pellonula leonensis Boulenger, 1916 (Small-toothed pellonula)
 Pellonula vorax Günther, 1868 (Big-toothed pellonula)

References
 

Clupeidae
Fish of Africa
Freshwater fish genera
Taxa named by Albert Günther